Stathmopoda margabim is a species of moth of the family Stathmopodidae. It is endemic in Réunion island in the Indian Ocean, where it can be found from medium altitudes to high altitudes of more than 1300 meters.

See also
List of moths of Réunion

References

Stathmopodidae
Endemic fauna of Réunion
Moths of Réunion
Moths described in 1995